The Emperor and the Assassin, also known as The First Emperor, is a 1998 - 1999 Chinese historical romance film based primarily on Jing Ke's assassination attempt on the King of Qin, as described in Sima Qian's Records of the Grand Historian. The film was directed by Chen Kaige and stars Gong Li, Zhang Fengyi, Li Xuejian, and Zhou Xun. The film was well received critically and won the Technical Prize at the 1999 Cannes Film Festival. It was the most expensive Chinese film made up to that time, costing US$20 million.

Plot
The film covers much of Ying Zheng's career, recalling his early experiences as a hostage and foreshadowing his dominance over China. He is essentially depicted as an idealist seeking to impose a peace or unity on the world. However, his experiencing of various betrayals and losses slowly turn him into a mad tyrant. The story consists of three main incidents: the attempt by Jing Ke to assassinate Ying Zheng in 227 BCE; the (fictitious) rumour of a Chief Minister's having sired the latter before transferring his concubine to become the Queen Dowager; and the story of an official having sired children by the Queen Dowager herself. The first incident is the climax of the film, with earlier scenes foreshadowing it; the other two incidents occur between the fictional genesis and historical manifestation of the first.

In the film, Ying Zheng sends his concubine Lady Zhao to the Yan state as a spy to enlist a Yan assassin to attempt to assassinate him, intending to use that as a casus belli to start a war against Yan. Lady Zhao persuades Jing Ke to perform the assassination. After learning of Ying Zheng's massacre of the children in her home state of Zhao, Lady Zhao desires the assassination in earnest. The attempt fails, but Ying Zheng expresses his fury when his associates make no attempt to stop the assassin and he is forced to kill Jing Ke himself. He is further saddened when Lady Zhao returns to Qin only to retrieve Jing Ke for burial.

Cast
 Gong Li as Lady Zhao
 Zhang Fengyi as Jing Ke
 Li Xuejian as Ying Zheng
 Gu Yongfei as Queen Dowager
 Wang Zhiwen as Lao Ai
 Lü Xiaohe as Fan Yuqi
 Sun Zhou as Crown Prince Dan of Yan
 Chen Kaige as Lü Buwei
 Pan Changjiang as prison official
 Zhou Xun as blind girl
 Cong Zhijun as old official
 Li Longyin as shop owner
 Li Qiang as Han messenger
 Zhao Benshan as Gao Jianli
 Ding Haifeng as Qin Wuyang
 Hu Yang as young official
 Zhang Shen as dwarf
 Li Hongtao as Li Si
 Wei Chao as Doujiyan
 Han Dong as Qin cart driver
 Li Zhonglin as Qin prison guard
 Liu Tielian as palace ritual eunuch
 Kong Qinsan as face tattooist
 Xie Zengran as younger Wang brother
 Chang Tao as older Wang brother
 Zhang Jinzhan as Yan ambassador
 Zhao Yanguo as artist
 Lin Luyue as warrior
 Liu Jiacheng as warrior
 Chu Xu as warrior
 Liu Bo as warrior
 Liu Liang as warrior

Awards
The Emperor and the Assassin won the Technical Grand Prize at the 1999 Cannes Film Festival and was in competition for the Palme d'Or. Zhao Fei was awarded the 1999 Golden Rooster Award for Best Cinematography.

Background
Chen Kaige noted upon the film's premiere at the Cannes Film Festival that he hoped The Emperor and the Assassin would hold relevance to the events of the time, notably the Yugoslav Wars.

See also
 List of historical drama films of Asia
 The Emperor's Shadow
 Hero (2002 film)
 Rise of the Great Wall
 Qin Shi Huang (2001 TV series)
 Assassinator Jing Ke

References

External links
Official site from Sony Pictures Classics

1998 films
1998 romantic drama films
1990s historical romance films
Chinese epic films
Chinese historical romance films
1990s Mandarin-language films
Films directed by Chen Kaige
Films set in the Warring States period
Films set in the Qin dynasty
Cultural depictions of Qin Shi Huang
Chinese romantic drama films